In game theory, Deadlock is a game where the action that is mutually most beneficial is also dominant. This provides a contrast to the Prisoner's Dilemma where the mutually most beneficial action is dominated.  This makes Deadlock of rather less interest, since there is no conflict between self-interest and mutual benefit.
On the other hand, deadlock game can also impact the economic  behaviour and changes to equilibrium outcome in society.

General definition 

Any game that satisfies the following two conditions constitutes a Deadlock game: (1) e>g>a>c  and (2) d>h>b>f.  These conditions require that d and D be dominant.  (d, D) be of mutual benefit, and that one prefer one's opponent play c rather than d.

Like the Prisoner's Dilemma, this game has one unique Nash equilibrium: (d, D).

Example  

In this deadlock game, if Player C and Player D cooperate, they will get a payoff of 1 for both of them. If they both defect, they will get a payoff of 2 for each. However, if Player C cooperates and Player D defects, then C gets a payoff of 0 and D gets a payoff of 3.

Deadlock and social cooperation 
Even though deadlock game can satisfy group and individual benefit at mean time, but it can be influenced by dynamic one-side-offer bargaining deadlock model.
As a result, deadlock negotiation may happen for buyers. To deal with deadlock negotiation, three types of strategies are founded to break through deadlock and buyer's negotiation. Firstly, using power move to put a price on the status quo to create a win-win situation. Secondly, process move is used for overpowering the deadlock negotiation. Lastly, appreciative moves can help buyer to satisfy their own perspectives and lead to successful cooperation.

References

External links and offline sources
GameTheory.net
 C. Hauert: "Effects of space in 2 x 2 games". International Journal of Bifurcation and Chaos in Applied Sciences and Engineering 12 (2002) 1531–1548.
 
 
 

Non-cooperative games